Thomas Alfred Dyson (December 31, 1851 – April 29, 1898) was an American lawyer and politician.

Born in Milwaukee, Wisconsin, Dyson was educated in the Milwaukee public schools. Dyson was a court stenographer. He also was a newspaper reporter for the La Crosse Republican and Leader from 1873 to 1881. Dyson lived in La Crosse, Wisconsin. From 1887 to 1891, Dyson served in the Wisconsin State Senate and was a Republican. From 1887 to 1898, Dyson served as La Crosse County, Wisconsin judge. Dyson died in La Crosse, Wisconsin.

Notes

1851 births
1898 deaths
Politicians from Milwaukee
Politicians from La Crosse, Wisconsin
Journalists from Wisconsin
Wisconsin lawyers
Wisconsin state court judges
Wisconsin state senators
19th-century American politicians
19th-century American judges
19th-century American lawyers